Sadi Gülçelik (22 October 1930–19 August 1980) was a Turkish basketball player, civil engineer and entrepreneur.

SadiGülçelik was born in Istanbul, Turkey on 22 October 1930. He played for Galatasaray Volleyball and Galatasaray Basketball, which was nicknamed "The invincible Armada", Gülçelik was also part of the basketball teams Karagücü and Modaspor. He participated at the 1952 Summer Olympics in Helsinki, Finland. He scored 206 points in total for the Turkey national basketball team.

He graduated from Istanbul Technical University as a civil engineer and established Enka Construction Co. with his brother-in-law Şarık Tara in 1957.

Gülçelik died in an air disaster in Riyadh, Saudi Arabia on 19 August 1980.

A sports complex, Enka Sadi Gülçelik Spor Sitesi, in Sarıyer, Istanbul is named in his honor.

References

1929 births
Basketball players from Istanbul
Istanbul Technical University alumni
Turkish civil engineers
Galatasaray S.K. (men's basketball) players
Turkish men's basketball players
Olympic basketball players of Turkey
Basketball players at the 1952 Summer Olympics
Gülcelik, Sadi
Victims of aviation accidents or incidents in Saudi Arabia
1980 deaths